Janadhipathya Samrakshana Samithi ( translation: Association for Defence of Democracy) is a political party in the Indian state of Kerala. The party was formed in 1994 when the CPI(M) leader K.R. Gowri Amma was expelled from Communist Party of India (Marxist).

JSS Sathjith group is allianced with United Democratic Front in Kerala led by Indian National congress. JSS won four seats in the 2001 Legislative Assembly election in Kerala (the party had launched candidates in five constituencies).
K.R. Gowri Amma, elected from the Aroor constituency, was the Minister for Agriculture in the A.K. Antony state government.

Splinter Groups

Defunct Groups
 JSS (Rajanbabu) led by Rajanbabu merged with JSS (official)
 JSS (Shaju) led by K. K. Shaju merged with Congress
 JSS (Pradeep) led by  P.S. Pradeep merged with CPI
 JSS (Ithihas) led by KT Ithihas, former political secretary  and Ex Chairman merged with Communist Marxist Party (John)
 JSS (Secular) led by Varinjam Rajeev merged with All India Forward Bloc

Special Notes
1. One of their prominent state leader from the beginning of the party, Adv. Sathjith,s faction make outside alliance with LDF after discussions with state leaders of LDF on 2016 march.
 
2. The Rajan Babu faction of the JSS Joined the NDA on 11 March 2016.This was Announced by Rajan Babu. After Discussions with BJP State President Kummanam Rajasekharan and BDJS Leader Vellappally Natesan at Kayamkulam. And he left NDA in 2019 and merge with JSS (Gowri amma)

Mass Organisations
 Janadhipathiya Mahila samithy (JMS)
 Janathipathiya Yuvajana Samithy (JYS)
 Janathipathiya Trade Union Centre (JTUC)
 Janathipathiya Karshaka Samithy (JKS)
 kerala Karshaka Thozhilaly Union (KKTU)
 Federation Of Democratic Employees And Teachers Organization (FDETO) 
 Janathipathya Abhibhashaka Samithi (JAS)

References

External links

K.R. Gouri Amma's page at the official site of Kerala government  
K.R. Gouri Amma's page at Kerala Legislative Assembly site 
Election Result Aroor

1994 establishments in Kerala
Communist parties in India
Communist Party of India (Marxist) breakaway groups
Political parties established in 1994
State political parties in Kerala